The 1997–98 UNLV Runnin' Rebels basketball team represented the University of Nevada, Las Vegas. The team was coached by Bill Bayno and played their home games at the Thomas & Mack Center on UNLV's main campus in Paradise, Nevada as a member of the Western Athletic Conference. The Runnin' Rebels finished the season 20–13, 7–7 in WAC play. They won the 2000 Mountain West Conference men's basketball tournament to receive an automatic bid to the 1998 NCAA Division I men's basketball tournament, earning a No. 12 seed in the East Region. The Runnin' Rebels lost to No. 5 seed Princeton in the opening round. This was the first NCAA Tournament appearance for the program since back-to-back Final Four appearances in 1990 and 1991.

Roster

Schedule and results 

|-
!colspan=9 style=| Non-conference regular season

|-
!colspan=9 style=| WAC regular season

|-
!colspan=9 style=| WAC tournament

|-
!colspan=9 style=| NCAA tournament

References 

UNLV Runnin' Rebels basketball seasons
UNLV
UNLV
UNLV Runnin' Rebels basketball team
UNLV Runnin' Rebels basketball team